KTAK (93.9 FM) is a radio station broadcasting a country music format. Licensed to Riverton, Wyoming, United States. The station is currently owned by Edwards Communications, Lc and features programming from Cumulus Media and Westwood One.

References

External links

Country radio stations in the United States
TAK